Only Run is the fourth album by American musical project Clap Your Hands Say Yeah, self-released on June 3, 2014.

Track listing
"As Always"
"Blameless"
"Coming Down" (featuring Matt Berninger)
"Little Moments"
"Only Run"
"Your Advice"
"Beyond Illusion"
"Impossible Request"
"Cover Up" (featuring Kid Koala)

Bonus track
 "Impossible Request" (alt. version; available via download code)

References

2014 albums
Clap Your Hands Say Yeah albums